The hermit wood wren or Santa Marta wood wren (Henicorhina anachoreta) is a species of bird in the family Troglodytidae.
It is endemic to the Sierra Nevada de Santa Marta of northern Colombia.

Taxonomy and systematics

The hermit wood wren was first described in 1899 as a subspecies of grey-breasted wood wren (Henicorhina leucophrys). In June 2016 the South American Classification Committee of the American Ornithological Society (SACC/AOS) elevated it to species rank and the International Ornithological Committee (IOC) and the Clements taxonomy followed suit. The parties adopted the name "hermit wood wren" to avoid confusion with the Santa Marta wren (Troglodytes monticola). It has no subspecies.

Description

Its crown and nape are olive-brown and its upperparts a sooty or rusty brown. Its throat is whitish gray with indistinct streaks, its breast a medium gray, and its flanks are russet.

Distribution and habitat

The hermit wood wren is found only in the Sierra Nevada de Santa Marta, an isolated mountain range in northern Colombia.

Behavior

Feeding

As far as is known, the hermit wood wren's feeding behavior and diet are generally like those of H. leucophrys. Its diet appears to be solely invertebrates. However, it has not been recorded following army ant swarms.

Breeding

No information about the hermit wood wren's breeding phenology has been published.

Vocalization

The hermit wood wren's song "differs significantly from [that of] H. l. bangsi in being characterized by a higher frequency and a greater frequency range". (H. l. bangsi is the subspecies of grey-breasted wood wren that is found in lower elevations of the Sierra Nevada de Santa Marta.) Like the grey-breasted wood wren, it is "far more easily heard than seen."

Status

The IUCN has assessed the hermit wood wren as Near Threatened. It has a restricted range and though its population has not been quantified, it is believed to be decreasing. It does tolerate a degree of habitat disturbance and occurs in some protected areas.

References

hermit wood wren
Birds of the Sierra Nevada de Santa Marta
Endemic birds of Colombia
hermit wood wren